Dęby  is a village in the administrative district of Gmina Bobrowice, within Krosno Odrzańskie County, Lubusz Voivodeship, in western Poland.

The village has a population of 86.

References

Villages in Krosno Odrzańskie County